Crestwood Secondary School is a high school located at 1885 Sherbrooke Street West in Peterborough, Ontario, Canada. It was established in 1963 and enrolled 1075 students in grades 9 through 12 in 2001. It is a member of the Kawartha Pine Ridge District School Board.

Campus
Crestwood, named by its first principal, Warren W. Watt, opened in 1963 with extensions and the addition of the Learning Information Centre following within a few years. It neighbors James Strath Public School, which is the largest feeder school for Crestwood. It contains a track just short of 400 metres, two baseball fields, a football field that doubles as soccer fields, a tennis court, a shot put area, and a triple jump area.

School community
The community surrounding Crestwood is evenly split between rural and urban, with approximately 61% of students travelling by bus to Crestwood.

Students that attend Crestwood reside in the west end of Peterborough, Ontario as well as Cavan, Springville, Millbrook, North and South Monaghan Townships, Mount Pleasant, Bailieboro, and Fraserville.

See also
List of high schools in Ontario

External links
Crestwood Secondary School

High schools in Peterborough, Ontario
Educational institutions established in 1963
1963 establishments in Ontario